Zhang Zhiqiang (born 15 December 1978 in Zibo, Shandong) is a Chinese Rugby union player who plays at the fly-half position.

Zhiqiang is considered the greatest Chinese Rugby player of all-time. He plays for the China Agricultural University (CAU) club in Beijing, and prior to this, he had a stint with the Leicester Tigers during the 2003-04 Premiership season. He plays with the China national team as well as with the China sevens national team.

References

External links 
 
 
 Zhiqiang blog 
 Zhang Zhiqiang's Sina Weibo 

1974 births
Living people
Chinese rugby union players
Rugby union fly-halves
Sportspeople from Zibo
Chinese expatriate rugby union players
Expatriate rugby union players in Australia
Expatriate rugby union players in England
Chinese expatriate sportspeople in England
Chinese expatriate sportspeople in Australia
Asian Games medalists in rugby union
Rugby union players at the 2002 Asian Games
Rugby union players at the 2006 Asian Games
Rugby union players at the 2010 Asian Games
Medalists at the 2006 Asian Games
Asian Games bronze medalists for China
Leicester Tigers players